Tribute to Lester is an album recorded in 2001 by the Art Ensemble of Chicago and released on ECM in 2003, their first release on the label since The Third Decade (1984). It features performances by Roscoe Mitchell, Malachi Favors Maghostut and Don Moye. The album was recorded following Joseph Jarman's temporary retirement from the group and the death of founding member Lester Bowie to whom it is dedicated.

Reception
The Allmusic review by Richard S. Ginell awarded the album 4 stars, noting that, "the group receives probably the most stunning, precisely etched recorded sound of its existence. Yet despite the retrospective nature of some of the selections, there is no overt nostalgia or compromise in the AEC's aesthetic stance, probably figuring that Bowie would have wanted it that way".

Track listing
 "Sangaredi" (Moye) - 7:42  
 "Suite for Lester" (Mitchell) - 5:24  
 "Zero/Alternate Line" (Bowie, Mitchell) - 9:16  
 "Tutankhamun" (Favors) - 8:10  
 "As Clear as the Sun" (Favors, Mitchell, Moye) - 12:41  
 "He Speaks to Me Often in Dreams" (Favors, Mitchell, Moye) - 13:52  
Recorded September 2001 in Chicago

Personnel
Malachi Favors Maghostut: bass, percussion instruments
Roscoe Mitchell: saxophones, clarinets, flute, percussion instruments 
Don Moye: drums, percussion

References

2003 albums
ECM Records albums
Art Ensemble of Chicago albums
Tribute albums
Albums produced by Manfred Eicher